Human presence in space is about humanity in space, particularly about all anthropogenic presence in space and human activity in space, that is in outer space and in a broader sense also on any extraterrestrial astronomical body.

Humans have been present in space either, in the common sense, through their direct presence and activity like human spaceflight, or through mediation of their presence and activity like with uncrewed spaceflight, making "telepresence" possible. Human presence in space, particularly through mediation, can take many physical forms from space debris, uncrewed spacecraft, artificial satellites, space observatories, crewed spacecraft, art in space, to human outposts in outer space such as space stations. While human presence in space, particularly its continuation and permanence can be a goal in itself, human presence can have a range of purposes and modes from space exploration, commercial use of space to space settlement or even colonization and militarisation of space. Human presence in space is realized and sustained through the advancement and application of space sciences, particularly astronautics in the form of spaceflight and space infrastructure.

Humans have achieved some mediated presence throughout the Solar System, but the most extensive presence has been in orbit around Earth.  Humans have sustained direct presence in orbit around Earth since the year 2000 through continuously crewing the ISS, and with few interruptions through crewing the space station Mir since the later 1980s. The increasing and extensive human presence in orbital space around Earth, beside its benefits, has also produced a threat to it by carrying with it space debris, potentially cascading into the so-called Kessler syndrome. This has raised the need for regulation and mitigation of such to secure a sustainable access to outer space.

Securing the access to space and human presence in space has been pursued and allowed by the establishment of space law and space industry, creating a space infrastructure. But sustainability has remained a challenging goal, with the United Nations seeing the need to advance long-term sustainability of outer space activities in space science and application, and the United States having it as a crucial goal of its contemporary space policy and space program.

Terminology 
The United States has been using the term "human presence" to identify one of the long-term goals of its space program and its international cooperation. While it traditionally means and is used to name direct human presence, it is also used for mediated presence. Differentiating human presence in space between direct and mediated human presence, meaning human or non-human presence, such as with crewed or uncrewed spacecraft, is rooted in a history of how human presence is to be understood (see dedicated chapter).

Human, particularly direct, presence in space is sometimes replaced with "boots on the ground" or equated with space colonization. But such terms, particularly colonization and even settlement has been avoided and questioned to describe human presence in space, since they employ very particular concepts of appropriation, with historic baggage, addressing the forms of human presence in a particular and not general way.

Alternatively some have used the term "humanization of space", which differs in focusing on the general development, impact and structure of human presence in space.

On an international level the United Nations uses the phrase of "outer space activity" for the activity of its member states in space.

History 

Human presence in space, that is in outer space, above Earth's atmosphere, began with the first launches of artificial objects into outer space in the mid 20th century.

Since then the activity and presence in outer space has increased to the point where Earth is orbited by a vast number of artificial objects and the far reaches of the Solar System have been visited and explored by a range of space probes. Human presence throughout the Solar System is continued by different contemporary and future missions, most of them mediating human presence through robotic spaceflight.

First a realized project of the Soviet Union and followed in competition by the United States, human presence in space is now an increasingly international and commercial field.

Representation and participation 

Participation and representation of humanity in space is an issue of human access to and presence in space ever since the beginning of spaceflight. Different space agencies, space programs and interest groups such as the International Astronomical Union have been formed supporting or producing humanity's or a particular human presence in space. Representation has been shaped by the inclusiveness, scope and varying capabilities of these organizations and programs.

Some rights of non-spacefaring countries to partake in spaceflight have been secured through international space law, declaring space the "province of all mankind", understanding spaceflight as its resource, though sharing of space for all humanity is still criticized as imperialist and lacking, particularly regarding regulation of private spceflight.

Additionally to international inclusion the inclusion of women and people of colour has also been lacking. To reach a more inclusive spaceflight some organizations like the Justspace Alliance and IAU featured Inclusive Astronomy have been formed in recent years.

Law and governance 

Space activity is legally based on the Outer Space Treaty, the main international treaty. Though there are other international agreements such as the significantly less ratified Moon Treaty.

The Outer Space Treaty established the basic ramifications for space activity in article one:
"The exploration and use of outer space, including the Moon and other celestial bodies, shall be carried out for the benefit and in the interests of all countries, irrespective of their degree of economic or scientific development, and shall be the province of all mankind."

And continued in article two by stating:
"Outer space, including the Moon and other celestial bodies, is not subject to national appropriation by claim of sovereignty, by means of use or occupation, or by any other means."

The development of international space law has revolved much around outer space being defined as common heritage of mankind. The Magna Carta of Space presented by William A. Hyman in 1966 framed outer space explicitly  not as terra nullius but as res communis, which subsequently influenced the work of the United Nations Committee on the Peaceful Uses of Outer Space (COPUOS).

The United Nations Office for Outer Space Affairs and the International Telecommunication Union are international organizations central for facilitating space regulation, such as space traffic management.

Forms

Signals and radiation 

Humans have been producing a range of radiation which has reached space unintentionally as well as intentionally, well before any direct human presence in space.
Electromagnetic radiation such as light, of humans, has been reaching even stars as far away as the age of the radiation.

Beginning in the 20th century, humans have been sending radiation significantly into space. Nuclear explosions, especially high-altitude ones have since at times, starting with 1958, just a year after the first satellite Sputnik was launched, introduced strong and broad radiation from humans into space, producing electromagnetic pulses and orbital radiation belts, adding to the explosion's destructive potential on ground and in orbit.

While Earth's and humanities radiation profile is the main material for space based remote Earth observation, but radiation by human activity from Earth and from space has also been an obstacle for human activities, such as spiritual life or astronomy through light pollution and radio spectrum pollution from Earth and space. In the case of radio astronomy radio quiet zones have been kept and sought out, with the far side of the Moon being most pristine facing away from human made electromagnetic interference.

Space junk and human impact 

Space junk as product and form of human presence in space has existed ever since the first orbital spaceflights and comes mostly in the form of space debris in outer space. Space debris has been for example possibly the first human objects to have been present in space beyond Earth, reaching its escape velocity after being ejected purposefully from an exploded Aerobee rocket in 1957. Most space debris is in orbit around Earth, it can stay there for years to centuries if at altitudes from hundreds to thousands of kilometers, before it falls to Earth. Space debris is a hazard since it can hit and damage spacecraft. Having reached considerable amounts around Earth, policies have been put into place to prevent space debris and hazards, such as international regulation to prevent nuclear hazards in Earth's orbit and the Registration Convention as part of space traffic management.

But space junk can also come as result of human activity on astronomical bodies, such as the remains of space missions, like the many artificial objects left behind on the Moon, and on other bodies.

Robotic 

Human presence in space has been strongly based on the many robotic spacecraft, particularly as the many artificial satellites in orbit around Earth.

Many firsts of human presence in space have been achieved by robotic missions. The first artificial object to reach space, above the 100 km altitude Kármán line, and therefore performing the first sub-orbital flight was MW 18014 in 1944. But the first sustained presence in space was established by the orbital flight of Sputnik in 1957. Followed by a rich number of robotic space probes achieving human presence and exploration throughout the Solar system for the first time.

Human presence at the Moon was established by the Luna programme, with an impactor in 1959 (Luna 2), a lander (Luna 9) as well as an orbiter in 1966 (Luna 10) and in 1970 with the first rover (Lunokhod 1) on an extraterrestrial body.

Interplanetary presence was established at Venus by the Venera program, with a flyby in 1961 (Venera 1) and a crash in 1966 (Venera 3).

Presence in the outer Solar System was achieved by Pioneer 10 in 1972 and continuous presence in interstellar space by Voyager 1 in 2012.

The 1958 Vanguard 1 is the fourth artificial satellite and the oldest spacecraft still in space and orbit around Earth, though inactive.

Presence of non-human life from Earth 

Since the very beginning of human outer space activities in 1944, and possibly before that, life has been present with microscopic life as space contaminate and after 1960 as space research subjects. Prior to crewed spaceflight non-human animals had been subjects of space research, specifically bioastronautics and astrobiology, being exposed to ever higher testflights. The first animals (including humans) and plant seeds in space above the 100 km Kármán line were corn seeds and fruit flies, launched for the first time on 9 July 1946, with the first fruit flies launched and returned alive in 1947. In 1949 Albert II, became the first mammal and first primate reaching the 100 km Kármán line, and in 1957 the dog Laika became the first animal in orbit, with both also becoming the first fatalities of spaceflight and in space, respectively. Animals enduring early, often terminal flights to space paved the way for safe direct human spaceflight.

Plants first grown in 1966 with Kosmos 110 and in 1971 on Salyut 1, with the first producing seeds August 4, 1982 on Salyut 7. Plants and growing them in space and places such as the Moon have been important subjects of space research, but also as psychological support and possibly nutrition during continuous crewed presence in space.

Direct human presence in space 

Direct human presence in space was achieved with Yuri Gagarin flying a space capsule in 1961 for one orbit around Earth for the first time. While direct human presence in open space, by exiting a spacecraft in a spacesuit, a so-called extravehicular activity, has been achieved since the first person to do so, Alexei Leonov, in 1965.

Though Valentina Tereshkova was in 1963 the first woman in space, women saw no further presence in space until the 1980s and are still underrepresented, e.g. with no women ever being present on the Moon. An internationalization of direct human presence in space started with the first space rendezvous of two crews of different human spaceflight programs, the Apollo–Soyuz mission in 1975 and at the end of the 1970s with the Interkosmos program.

Space stations have harboured so far the only long-duration direct human presence in space. After the first station Salyut 1 (1971) and its tragic Soyuz 11 crew, space stations have been operated consecutively since Skylab (1973), having allowed a progression of long-duration direct human presence in space. Long-duration direct human presence has been joined by visiting crews since 1977 (Salyut 6). Consecutive direct human presence in space has been achieved since the Salyut successor Mir by 1987. Uninterrupted direct human presence in space has been achieved since the operational transition from the Mir to the ISS, with its first occupation in 2000.
At times since the first time in 1995 the number of people present in space at the same time has climbed up to 13 or even 16, in 2021, if suborbital flights are included. The ISS has hosted the most people in space at the same time, reaching 13 for the first time during the eleven day docking of STS-127 in 2009.

Beyond Earth the Moon has been the only astronomical object which so far has seen direct human presence through the week long Apollo missions between 1968 and 1972, beginning with the first orbit by Apollo 8 in 1968 and with the first landing by Apollo 11 in 1969. The longest extraterrestrial human stay was three days by Apollo 17.

While most persons who have been to space are Astronauts, professional members of human spaceflight programs, particularly governmental ones, the few others, starting in the 1980s, have been trained and gone to space as spaceflight participants, with the first space tourist staying in space in 2001.

By the end of the 2010s several hundred people from more than 40 countries have gone into space, most of them reaching orbit. 24 people have traveled beyond low Earth orbit and 12 of them walked on the Moon.
Space travelers have spent by 2007 over 29,000 person-days (or a cumulative total of over 77 years) in space including over 100 person-days of spacewalks.
Usual durations for individuals to inhabit space on long-duration stays are six months, with the longest stays on record being at about a year.

Space infrastructure 

A permanent human presence in space depends on an established space infrastructure which harbours, supplies and maintains human presence. Such infrastructure has originally been Earth ground-based, but with increased numbers of satellites and long-duration missions beyond the near side of the Moon space-to-space based infrastructure is being used. First simple interplanetary infrastructures have been created by space probes particularly when employing a system which combines a lander and a relaying orbiter.

Space stations are space habitats which have provided a crucial infrastructure for sustaining a continuous direct human, including non-human, presence in space. Space stations have been continuously present in orbit around Earth from Skylab in 1973, to the Salyut stations, Mir and eventually ISS.
The planned Artemis program includes the Lunar Gateway a future space station around the Moon as a multimission waystation.

Spiritual and artistic 

Human presence has also been expressed through spiritual and artistic installations in outer space or on the Moon.
Apollo 15 Mission Commander David Scott left for example a Bible on their Lunar rover during an extravehicular activity on the Moon. Space has furthermore been the sight of people taking part in religious festivities such as Christmas on the International Space Station.

Locations

Extraterrestrial bodies 

Humanity has reached different types of astronomical bodies, but the longest and most diverse presence (including non-human, e.g. sprouting plants) has been on the Moon, particularly because it is the first and only extraterrestrial body having been directly visited by humans.

Space probes have been mediating human presence on other astronomical bodies since their first visits to Venus. Mars has seen a continuous presence since 1997, after being first flown by in 1964 and landed on in 1971. A group of missions have been present on Mars since 2001, including continuous presence by a series of rovers since 2003.

Beside having reached some planetary-mass objects (that is planets, dwarf planets or the largest, so-called planetary-mass moons), humans have also reached, landed and in some cases even returned robotic probes from some small Solar System bodies, like asteroids and comets, with a range of space probes.

The Solar System region near the Sun's corona, inside Mercury's orbit, with its high gravitational potential difference from Earth and the subsequent high delta-v needed to reach it, has only been considerably pierced on highly elliptic orbits by some solar probes like Helios 1 & 2, as well as the more contemporary Parker Solar Probe. The latter being the closest to reach the Sun, breaking speed records with its very low solar altitudes at perihelion apsis.

Future direct human presence beyond Earth's orbit is possibly going to be re-introduced if current plans for crewed research stations to be established on Mars and on the Moon are continued to be developed.

Particular orbits 

Humans have been present beyond high planetary orbits soon after the first spaceflight.

Human presence in interplanetary orbits or heliocentric orbit has been the case with a range of artificial objects since the beginning of spaceflight.

Humans have also used and occupied co-orbital configurations, particularly at different liberation points with halo orbits, to harness the benefits of those so called Lagrange points.

Some interplanetary missions, particularly the Ulysses solar polar probe and considerably Voyager 1 and 2, as well as others like Pioneer 10 and 11, have entered trajectories taking them out of the ecliptic plane.

Outer Solar System 

Human presence in the outer Solar System has been established and continued by sofar nine space probes since the first visit to Jupiter in 1973 by Pioneer 10. Jupiter and Saturn are the only outer Solar System bodies which have been orbited by probes (Jupiter: Galileo in 1995 and Juno in 2016; Saturn: Cassini–Huygens in 2004), with all other outer Solar System probes performing flybys.

The Saturn moon Titan, with its special lunar atmosphere, has so far been the only body in the outer Solar System to be landed on by the Cassini–Huygens lander Huygens in 2005.

Outbound 

Several probes have reached Solar escape velocity, with Voyager 1 being the first to cross after 36 years of flight the heliopause and enter interstellar space on August 25, 2012, at distance of 121 AU from the Sun.

Living in space 

Space, particularly microgravity, make life different to life on Earth. Mundane needs such as air, pressure, temperature and light, as well as movement, hygiene and food intake are confronted with challenges.

Human health is mostly effected by long-duration stays particularly by the prevalent radiation exposure and the health effects of microgravity. Human fatalities have been the case due to accidents during spaceflight, particularly at launch and reentry. With the last in-flight accident killing humans, the Columbia accident in 2003, the sum of in-flight fatalities has risen to 15 astronauts and 4 cosmonauts, in five separate incidents. Over 100 others have died in accidents during activity directly related to spaceflight or testing.
 See List of spaceflight-related accidents and incidents

Bioastronautics, space medicine, space technology and space architecture are fields which are occupied with alleviating the effects of space on humans and non-humans.

Impact, environmental protection and sustainability 

Human space activity, and its subsequent presence, can and has been having an impact on space as well as on the capacity to access it. This impact of human space activity and presence, or its potential, has created the need to address its issues regarding planetary protection, space debris, nuclear hazards, radio pollution and light pollution, to the reusability of launch systems, for space not to become a sacrifice zone.

Sustainability has been a goal of space law, space technology and space infrastructure, with the United Nations seeing the need to advance long-term sustainability of outer space activities in space science and application, and the United States having it as a crucial goal of its contemporary space policy and space program.

Human presence in space is particularly being felt in orbit around Earth. The orbital space around Earth has seen increasing and extensive human presence, beside its benefits it has also produced a threat to it by carrying with it space debris, potentially cascading into the so-called Kessler syndrome. This has raised the need for regulation and mitigation of such to secure a sustainable access to outer space.

Study and reception 

Individually or as a society humans have engaged since pre-history in developing their perception of space above the ground, or the cosmos at large, and developing their place in it.

Social sciences have been studying such works of people from pre-history to the contemporary with the fields of archaeoastronomy to cultural astronomy. With actual human activity and presence in space the need for fields like astrosociology and space archaeology have been added.

Human presence observed from space 

Earth observation has been one of the first missions of spaceflight, resulting in a dense contemporary presence of Earth observation satellites, having a wealth of uses and benefits for life on Earth.

Viewing human presence from space, particularly by humans directly, has been reported by some astronauts to cause a cognitive shift in perception, especially while viewing the Earth from outer space, this effect has been called the overview effect.

Observation of space from space 

Parallel to the above overview effect the term "ultraview effect" has been introduced for a subjective response of intense awe some astronauts have experienced viewing large "starfields" while in space.

Space observatories like the Hubble Space Telescope have been present in Earth's orbit, benefiting from advantages from being outside Earth's atmosphere and away from its radio noise, resulting in less distorted observation results.

Direct and mediated human presence 

Related to the long discussion of what human presence constitutes and how it should be lived, the discussion about direct (e.g. crewed) and mediated (e.g. uncrewed) human presence, has been decisive for how space policy makers have chosen human presence and its purposes.

The relevance of this issue for space policy has risen with the advancement and resulting possibilities of telerobotics, to the point where most of the human presence in space has been reallized robotically, leaving direct human presence behind.

Localization in space 

The location of human presence has been studied throughout history by astronomy and was significant in order to relate to the heavens, that is to outer space and its bodies.

The historic argument between geocentrism and heliocentrism is one example about the location of human presence.

Scenarios of and relations to space beyond human presence 

Realizations of the scales of space, have been taken as subject to discuss human and life's existence or relations to space and time beyond them, with some understanding humanity's or life's presence as a singularity or one to be in isolation, pondering on the Fermi paradox.

A diverse range of arguments of how to relate to space beyond human presence have been raised, with some seeing space beyond humans as reason to venture out into space and exploring it, some aiming for contact with extraterrestrial life, to arguments for protection of humanity or life from its possibilities.

Considerations about the ecological integrity and independence of celestial bodies, counter exploitive understandings of space as dead, particularly in the sense of terra nullius, have raised issues such as rights of nature.

Purposes and uses 

Space and human presence in it has been the subject of different agendas.

Human presence in space at its beginnings, was fueled by the Cold War and its outgrowing the Space Race. During this time technological, nationalist, ideological and military competition were dominant driving factors of space policy and the resulting activity and, particularly direct human, presence in space.

With the waning of the Space Race, concluded by cooperation in human spaceflight, focus shifted in the 1970s further to space exploration and telerobotics, having a range of achievements and technological advances. Space exploration meant by then also an engagement by governments in the search for extraterrestrial life.

Since human activity and presence in space has been producing spin-off benefits, other than for the above purposes, such as Earth observation and communication satellites for civilian use, international cooperation to advance such benefits of human presence in space grew with time. Particularly for the purpose of continuing benefits of space infrastructure and space science the United Nations has been pushing for safeguarding human activity in outer space in a sustainable way.

With the contemporary so-called NewSpace, the aim of commercialization of space has grown along with a narrative of space habitation for the survival of some humans away from and without Earth, which in turn has been critically analyzed and highlighted colonialist purposes for human activity and presence in space. This has given rise for a deeper engagement in the fields of space environment and space ethics.

Overview of different purposes and uses 
 Space exploration#Rationales
 Benefits of space exploration
 NASA spinoff technologies
 Space research
 Earth observation
 Astronomy
 Space observatory
 Search for extraterrestrial life (see also first contact)
 Communication
 Spaceflight/Space transportation
 Commercial use of space
 Space tourism
 Space mining (see also Surface chauvinism and surfacism)
 Space manufacturing
 Environmental dumping
 Planetary protection
 Planetary defense
 Isolationism
 For presence, in itself (see Human outpost space basing)
 Space imperialism
 National or private potency and competition (see Space Race)
 Militarization of space
 Space habitation
 Emigration from Earth
 Integration or naturalization (see also biological naturalization such as Pantropy)
 Demographic push (e.g. due to overconsumption)
 Forced displacement
 Space and survival
 Escapism
 Space development as a purpose of progress (see also New Frontier)
 Expansionism
 Space colonization 
 Civilizing mission
 Terraforming (see also Ethics of terraforming)
 Directed panspermia

See also 
 
 
 Outline of space science
 Outline of space exploration
 Timeline of Solar System exploration
 List of spaceflight records
 Rights of nature
 Anthropogenic metabolism
 Anthroposphere
 Collective consciousness
 Scale (analytical tool)
 Noosphere
 Ecological civilization
 Human impact on the environment
 
 Human ecology
 Technosignature
 Extremophile

References

Further reading 

Space
Outer space
Space exploration